Akoye, also known as Lohiki or Maihiri (Mai-Hea-Ri), is an Angan language of Papua New Guinea.

Phonology
Akoye has a small phonemic inventory, which is not well described.

The first four are usually voiced to  after a monophthongal vowel, though sometimes the voicing is blocked for unknown reasons.

Diphthongs are said to be rare, though vowel sequences are common, so these are perhaps not equivalent.

The most complex syllable is CCVV:   'hair',  'eye'.

Tone plays a role:  'sky',  'lid';  (sp. bird),  'body'.

References

OLAC resources in and about the Akoye language

Further reading
 
 
 

Languages of Morobe Province
Angan languages